Miho Bošković (born 11 January 1983) is a Croatian professional water polo player. He was part of the Croatia national team, that won the gold medal at the 2012 Summer Olympics, as well as gold medals at the 2007 World Championship and 2010 European Championship, and bronze medals at the 2009 and 2011 World Championships.

Bošković plays for Vasas SC in the Hungarian Championship, at the position of the offensive player. He has played 108 matches for the national team., playing his first match in Montreal, at the 2005 World Championship.

With Jug, he won the 2005–06 LEN Champions League, LEN Super Cup, several national championships and cups. He was named the best European water polo player in 2007 and 2012, by LEN.

Scoring 369 goals, he has been the all-time top goalscorer for the senior Croatia national team.

Honours

Club

Jug Dubrovnik
LEN Champions League: 2005–06 ;runners-up: 2006–07, 2007–08, 2012–13 
LEN Super Cup: 2006
Adriatic League: 2008–09
Croatian Championship: 2003–04, 2004–05, 2005–06 2006–07, 2008–09, 2009–10, 2012–13, 2015–16
Croatian Cup: 2005–06, 2006–07, 2007–08, 2008–09, 2009–10
Vasas
Hungarian Championship: 2011–12

Awards
 LEN "European Player of the Year" award: 2007, 2012
 Croatian Water Polo Player of the Year: 2007  with Jug Dubrovnik

See also
 Croatia men's Olympic water polo team records and statistics
 List of Olympic champions in men's water polo
 List of Olympic medalists in water polo (men)
 List of world champions in men's water polo
 List of World Aquatics Championships medalists in water polo

References

External links
 

1983 births
Living people
Sportspeople from Dubrovnik
Croatian male water polo players
Water polo drivers
Water polo players at the 2008 Summer Olympics
Water polo players at the 2012 Summer Olympics
Medalists at the 2012 Summer Olympics
Olympic gold medalists for Croatia in water polo
World Aquatics Championships medalists in water polo
Expatriate water polo players
Vasas SC water polo players
Croatian expatriate sportspeople in Hungary